Atul Ltd (Atul) is an integrated chemical company founded by Kasturbhai Lalbhai on September 5, 1947 in India. The company manufactures 900 products and 400 formulations and owns 140 retail brands. It serves 4,000 customers belonging to 30 diverse industries and has established subsidiary companies in the US, the UK, the UAE, China and Brazil to serve its customers.

The first manufacturing site of the company in Atul, Gujarat is spread over 1,250 acres. The company has its registered office in Ahmedabad and head office at Atul, both in Gujarat, India.

Its shares are listed both at National Stock Exchange and Bombay Stock Exchange.

History 
1947: Incorporated by Kasturbhai Lalbhai as the first private sector company of independent India to be inaugurated by its first Prime Minister

1947: Established a joint venture (JV) with American Cyanamid Company of the US, Cyanamid India Ltd, to produce crop protection chemicals and pharmaceuticals

1955: Established a JV with Imperial Chemical Industries (ICI) plc of the UK, Atic Industries Ltd (Atic), to produce textile dyestuffs

1960: Established a JV with Ciba-Geigy Ltd (Ciba-Geigy) of Switzerland, Cibatul Ltd (Cibatul), to produce epoxy resins and curing agents.
1967: Started to manufacture phenoxy herbicides and in subsequent years added more products to the range

1978: Set-up Atul Rural Development Fund to formalize programs undertaken since inception related to serving society.

1985: Acquired controlling interest in Piramal Rasayan Ltd engaged in the production of dye-intermediates and renamed Amal Ltd.

1988: Acquired loss-making Gujarat Aromatics Ltd through a reverse merger and got its second production site in Ankleshwar.

1996: Merged Atic after the JV partner ICI PLC exited.

1997: Established a wholly owned subsidiary company, Atul Bioscience Ltd, to produce Active Pharmaceutical Ingredients (APIs) and their intermediates.

1999: Merged Cibatul after the JV partner Ciba-Geigy exited. 

2009: Established a JV with the Government of Rajasthan, Atul Rajasthan Date Palms Ltd, to produce tissue culture raised date palms for the first time in India.

2010: Acquired Anchor Adhesives Pvt Ltd which owned Polygrip, a leading Rubber and Polyurethane based adhesive brand in India.

2011: Acquired DPD Ltd in the UK engaged in the production of tissue culture raised date palms.

2011: Established a JV with Rudolf GmbH of Germany, Rudolf Atul Chemicals Ltd, to produce textile chemicals.

2017: Established a JV with Nouryon of the Netherlands, Anaven LLP, to produce MCA.

2019: Acquired a manufacturing site for Atul Bioscience Ltd at Ambernath, Maharashtra.

Products 
Atul manufactures 900 products and 400 formulations. It also owns around 140 brands. The prominent products manufactured by Atul include:

 para-Cresol, para-Anisic aldehyde, para-Cresidine
 Resorcinol formaldehyde resins, 1,3 Cyclohexanedione
 Vat Green 1, Vat Red 10, Vat Brown 1, Sulphur black, Pigment Red 168, Pigment Yellow 139
 2,4-Dichloro phenoxy acid and its derivatives, Chlorimuron ethyl, Isoprothiolane, Indoxacarb,  Propoxur,  Sulfosulfuron
 APIs - Venlafaxine HCl,  Desvenlafaxine succinate, Valacyclovir HCl,  Acyclovir, Fluconazole
 API intermediates - Phenyl chloroformate and CBZ-L-valine
 3,3’ and 4,4’ Diaminodiphenyl sulphone
 Multi-functional resins (tri-functional and tetra functional), epoxy systems for infusion, hand layup and adhesives for wind turbine blades, epoxy phenol novolac resins
 Reactive diluents (aliphatic, aromatic, mono, di and tri functional)

Operations 

Atul is headquartered at Atul in Valsad district in Gujarat, India. It has its registered office in Ahmedabad, Gujarat. It also has offices in Ahmedabad, Mumbai, New Delhi, Thane and other parts of India. It has manufacturing facilities in Ankleshwar, Atul and Panoli in Gujarat and Tarapur in Maharashtra in India. The Group companies have production facilities in Ambernath, Ankleshwar and Atul in Gujarat, India and Bristol in the United Kingdom. The joint venture companies have production facilities in Atul in Gujarat and Jodhpur in Rajasthan, India.

The company has presence in 90 countries and wholly owned subsidiary companies in Brazil (São Paulo), China (Shanghai), the UAE (Dubai), the UK (Wilmslow) and the USA (Charlotte).

Philanthropy 
Atul is engaged in serving society particularly in the fields of national priorities like education, empowerment and health, amongst others, which are carried out with the support of its companies and trusts. Atul Foundation was set up in 2011 as an umbrella trust.

Education 
Kalyani Shala was set up in 1953 for providing quality and affordable education to children living in Atul and surrounding towns and villages. It offers classes from kindergarten to 12 and the medium of instruction is Gujarati. It has 1,800 students.

Atul Vidyalaya was set up in 1991. It is providing quality education to children living in Atul and surrounding towns and villages. It offers classes from kindergarten to 12 and the medium of instruction is English. It has 1,200 students.

Atul Vidyamandir, a residential school for tribal students, was set up in 2009 based on the public-private partnership model with the Government of Gujarat.  It offers classes from 6 to 12 and the medium of instruction is Gujarati. It has 380 students.

Empowerment 
Urmi Stree Sanstha was established in 1953 to empower women from nearby villages. It is engaged in production and supply of pure and traditionally prepared spices.

Atul Institute of Vocational Excellence, a residential institute to impart skills to tribal youth, was set up in 2011 based on the PPP model with the Government of Gujarat. It offers 11 courses and the medium of instruction is Gujarati. It trains 1,000 students per year.

Atul has adopted four industrial training institutes (ITI) for upgradation – ITI Khergam, ITI Sagbara, ITI Ankleshwar and ITI Biliomora based on the PPP model with the Government of Gujarat.

Atul Foundation through its implementing agencies undertakes various training programs to train ~300 women every year from nearby villages in beauty and styling, garment making, handicraft and soft toy making and beauty. Women are also trained as teachers of village schools.

Health 
Atul organises various health camps, which benefit 5,000 less privileged people every year. Atul has so far constructed 5,500 household toilets.

Atul Foundation takes up relief measures and reaches out to disaster affected people | communities. It also tries to improve rural infrastructure by renovating | building better amenities such as roads, streetlights, water facilities, schools and anganwadi structures.

Employees 
As of March 31, 2020, the company has 5,370 employees, 2,463 of whom are temporary, contractual or casual employees. The company has 2,907 permanent employees, of which 115 are women (4%) and six are differently abled (0.2%).

References 

Chemical companies of India
Manufacturing companies based in Ahmedabad
Indian companies established in 1947
Lalbhai Group
Chemical companies established in 1947
Companies listed on the National Stock Exchange of India
Companies listed on the Bombay Stock Exchange